The Hague Convention on the Civil Aspects of International Child Abduction or Hague Abduction Convention is a multilateral treaty that provides an expeditious method to return a child internationally abducted by a parent from one member country to another. The convention was drafted to ensure the prompt return of children who have been abducted from their country of habitual residence or wrongfully retained in a contracting state not their country of habitual residence.

The convention was developed by the Hague Conference on Private International Law (HCCH). The convention was concluded 25 October 1980 and entered into force between the signatories on 1 December 1983. 

The primary intention of the convention is to preserve whatever status quo child custody arrangement existed immediately before an alleged wrongful removal or retention thereby deterring a parent from crossing international boundaries in search of a more sympathetic court. The Convention applies only to children under the age of 16.

As 2022, there are 103 parties to the convention; Botswana and Cape Verde being the last countries to accede, in 2022.

Procedural nature

The Convention does not alter any substantive rights of that of the parent or the child. The Convention requires that a court in which a Hague Convention action is filed should not consider the merits of any underlying child custody dispute, but should determine only the country in which that dispute should be adjudicated. Return of the child is to the member country rather than specifically to the left-behind parent.

The Convention requires the return of a child who was a "habitual resident" in a contracting party immediately before an action that constitutes a breach of custody or access rights. The Convention provides that all contracting states, as well as any judicial and administrative bodies of those contracting states, "shall act expeditiously in all proceedings seeking the return of a children" and that those institutions shall use the most expeditious procedures available to the end that final decision be made within six weeks from the date of commencement of the proceedings.

Wrongful removal or retention
The Convention provides that the removal or retention of a child is "wrongful" whenever:

These rights of custody may arise by operation of law or by reason of a judicial or administrative decision, or by reason of an agreement having legal effect under the law of the country of habitual residence. The explanatory report of the convention clarifies what wrongful is in this meaning:

From the Convention's standpoint, the removal of a child by one of the joint holders without the consent of the other, is ... wrongful, and this wrongfulness derives in this particular case, not from some action in breach of a particular law, but from the fact that such action has disregarded the rights of the other parent which are also protected by law, and has interfered with their normal exercise.

The developing international jurisprudence on the application of the convention is beginning to place less emphasis on the intention of the parents in determining whether wrongful removal or retention of the child has occurred. For instance, in the 2018 Supreme Court of Canada's decision of the Office of the Children's Lawyer v. Balev, the Supreme Court held that a presiding judge should consider all relevant considerations in deciding whether child abduction has occurred, and parental intention or agreement is but one of the many factors to consider. The same approach was taken by the European Union where the Fifth Chamber held in O.L. v. P.Q. (2017) C‑111/17 that the intention of the parents by itself cannot, as a general rule, be crucial to the determination of the habitual residence of a child.
This position is also shared by the jurisprudence of U.K., Australia and New Zealand. The approach in the U.S. on the role that parental intention play in the determination of whether child abduction has occurred is divided.

The implication of this approach is that a child's habitual residence could change while staying with one parent in a different jurisdiction notwithstanding and despite any agreement between the parents as to the child's habitual residence.

Habitual residence
The determination of a child's place of habitual residence is key to an application for return of the child under the convention. The application can succeed only if a child was, immediately before the alleged removal or retention, habitually resident in the Member State to which return is sought.

The Convention does not define the term "habitual residence", but it is not intended to be a technical term.

The jurisprudence of the EU holds that the 'habitual residence' of a child is a place where the child has some degree of integration in a social and family environment. The deciding court must take into account all circumstances specific to each individual case. To constitute habitual residence, the child must be physically present at that place and that presence cannot be temporary or intermittent. Other factors relevant to the determination of habitual residence include the duration, regularity, conditions and reasons for the child's stay on the territory of a Member State and the child's nationality.

A similar approach, known as the "hybrid approach" was adopted in Canada following the landmark decision of Office of the Children's Lawyer v. Balev. Under the hybrid approach, the judge determining habitual residence must look to all relevant considerations arising from the facts of the case. In particular, the application judge determines the focal point of the child's life which is the family and social environment in which its life has developed, immediately prior to the removal or retention. The judge considers all relevant links and circumstances – the child's links to and circumstances in country A; the circumstances of the child's move from country A to country B; and the child's links to and circumstances in country B.

There is jurisprudence in the U.S. which continues to treat shared parental intent as a decisive factor in the determination of a child's habitual residence. Under this analysis, a parent cannot unilaterally create a new habitual residence by wrongfully removing or sequestering a child. Because the determination of "habitual residence" is primarily a "fact based" determination and not one which is encumbered by legal technicalities, the court must look at those facts, the shared intentions of the parties, the history of the children's location and the settled nature of the family prior to the facts giving rise to the request for return.

Special rules of evidence
The Convention provides special rules for admission and consideration of evidence independent of the evidentiary standards set by any member nation. Article 30 provides that the Application for Assistance, as well as any documents attached to that application or submitted to or by the Central Authority are admissible in any proceeding for a child's return. The convention also provides that no member nation can require legalization or other similar formality of the underlying documents in context of a Convention proceeding. Furthermore, the court in which a Convention action is proceeding "may take notice directly of the law of, and of judicial or administrative decisions, formally recognized or not in the State of habitual residence of the child, without recourse to the specific procedures for the proof of that law or for the recognition of foreign decisions which would otherwise be applicable" when determining whether there is a wrongful removal or retention under the convention.

Limited defenses to return
The Convention limits the defenses against return of a wrongfully removed or retained child. To defend against the return of the child, the defendant must establish to the degree required by the applicable standard of proof (generally determined by the lex fori, i.e. the law of the state where the court is located):

(a) that Petitioner was not "actually exercising custody rights at the time of the removal or retention" under Article 3; or

(b) that Petitioner "had consented to or acquiesced in the removal or retention" under Article 13; or

(c) that more than one year has passed from the time of wrongful removal or retention until the date of the commencement of judicial or administrative proceedings, and the child has "settled in its new environment", under Article 12;

(d) that the child is old enough and has a sufficient degree of maturity to knowingly object to being returned to the Petitioner and that it is appropriate to heed that objection, under Article 13; or

(e) that "there is grave risk that the child's return would expose the child to physical or psychological harm or otherwise place the child in an intolerable situation," under Article 13(b); or

(f) that return of the child would subject the child to violation of basic human rights and fundamental freedoms, under Article 20.

The best interests of the child plays a limited role in deciding an application made under the convention. In X v. Latvia, a Grand Chamber of the European Court of Human Rights decision noted by the 2017 Special Commission on the Practical Operation of the convention, the court stated that "the concept of the best interests of the child must be evaluated in light of the exceptions provided for by the Convention, which concerns the passage of time (Article 12), the conditions of application of the Convention (Article 13 (a)) and the existence of a 'grave risk' (Article 13 (b)), and compliance with the fundamental principles of the requested State on the protection of human rights and fundamental freedoms (Article 20)."

Grave risks exception – Article 13(b)

In X v. Latvia, the Grand Chamber held that the parent who opposes the return of a child on the basis of Article 13(b) exception must adduce sufficient evidence of the existence of a risk that can be specifically described as "grave". Further, as held by the Grand Chamber, while Article 13(b) contemplates "grave risk" to entail not only "physical or psychological harm", but also "an intolerable situation", such situation does not include the inconveniences necessarily linked to the experience of return, but only situations which goes beyond what a child might reasonably bear.

State parties

As of November 2022, there are 103 parties to the convention. The last states to accede to the convention were Botswana and Cape Verde in 2022.

See also
International child abduction
Child abduction
Child laundering
Child harvesting
List of international adoption scandals
Hague Adoption Convention
Hague Abduction Convention Compliance Reports (US)
International Child Abduction Remedies Act (US)
Hague Conference on Private International Law

References

External links

Full Text of the Convention
Explanatory Report by Elisa Perez-Vera
INCADAT – Case-law database of different jurisdictions concerning the 1980 Hague Child Abduction Convention
 US State Department International – Parental Child Abduction – Compliance Report 2011 
Contracting States
The Child Abduction Section of the Hague Conference website
Hague Conference Guides to good practice
The Hague Domestic Violence Project International Child Abduction and Domestic Violence
Multiple perspectives on the implications of the Hague Convention
How Hague Convention Cases are tried in the USA ?

Family law treaties
Treaties concluded in 1980
Treaties entered into force in 1983
Child Abduction
International child abduction
Treaties of Albania
Treaties of Argentina
Treaties of Australia
Treaties of Austria
Treaties of Barbados
Treaties of Belarus
Treaties of Belgium
Treaties of Bolivia
Treaties of Bosnia and Herzegovina
Treaties of Brazil
Treaties of Bulgaria
Treaties of Canada
Treaties of Chile
Treaties extended to British Hong Kong
Treaties extended to Portuguese Macau
Treaties of Costa Rica
Treaties of Croatia
Treaties of Cyprus
Treaties of the Czech Republic
Treaties of Denmark
Treaties of Estonia
Treaties of Ecuador
Treaties of Finland
Treaties of France
Treaties of Georgia (country)
Treaties of West Germany
Treaties of Greece
Treaties of the Hungarian People's Republic
Treaties of Iceland
Treaties of Ireland
Treaties of Israel
Treaties of Italy
Treaties of Jamaica
Treaties of South Korea
Treaties of Latvia
Treaties of Lithuania
Treaties of Luxembourg
Treaties of Malta
Treaties of Mauritius
Treaties of Mexico
Treaties of Monaco
Treaties of Montenegro
Treaties of Morocco
Treaties of the Netherlands
Treaties of New Zealand
Treaties of Norway
Treaties of Panama
Treaties of Paraguay
Treaties of Peru
Treaties of Poland
Treaties of Portugal
Treaties of Romania
Treaties of Russia
Treaties of Serbia and Montenegro
Treaties of Slovakia
Treaties of Slovenia
Treaties of South Africa
Treaties of Spain
Treaties of Sri Lanka
Treaties of Sweden
Treaties of Switzerland
Treaties of North Macedonia
Treaties of Turkey
Treaties of Ukraine
Treaties of the United States
Treaties of the United Kingdom
Treaties of Uruguay
Treaties of Venezuela
Treaties of Andorra
Treaties of Armenia
Treaties of the Bahamas
Treaties of Belize
Treaties of Burkina Faso
Treaties of Colombia
Treaties of the Dominican Republic
Treaties of El Salvador
Treaties of Fiji
Treaties of Gabon
Treaties of Guatemala
Treaties of Guinea
Treaties of Honduras
Treaties of Iraq
Treaties of Japan
Treaties of Kazakhstan
Treaties of Lesotho
Treaties of Nicaragua
Treaties of Moldova
Treaties of Pakistan
Treaties of the Philippines
Treaties of Saint Kitts and Nevis
Treaties of San Marino
Treaties of Seychelles
Treaties of Singapore
Treaties of Thailand
Treaties of Trinidad and Tobago
Treaties of Turkmenistan
Treaties of Uzbekistan
Treaties of Zambia
Treaties of Zimbabwe
Treaties of Yugoslavia
Child custody
1980 in the Netherlands
Treaties extended to the Caribbean Netherlands
Treaties extended to Anguilla
Treaties extended to Bermuda
Treaties extended to the Cayman Islands
Treaties extended to the Falkland Islands
Treaties extended to the Isle of Man
Treaties extended to Jersey
Treaties extended to Montserrat
Treaties extended to Clipperton Island
Treaties extended to French Guiana
Treaties extended to French Polynesia
Treaties extended to the French Southern and Antarctic Lands
Treaties extended to Guadeloupe
Treaties extended to Martinique
Treaties extended to New Caledonia
Treaties extended to Réunion
Treaties extended to Saint Pierre and Miquelon
Treaties extended to Wallis and Futuna
20th century in The Hague